{{Automatic taxobox
| image = Utah Museum of Natural History - IMG 1773.JPG
| image_caption = Notogoneus osculus
| fossil_range = 
| taxon = Notogoneus
| authority = Cope, 1885
| type_species = Notogoneus osculus
| type_species_authority = Cope, 1885
| subdivision_ranks = Species
| subdivision = *†Notogoneus cuvieri (Agassiz, 1844)
†Notogoneus gracilis Sytchevskaya, 1986
†Notogoneus janeti Priem, 1908
†Notogoneus longiceps von Meyer, 1848
†Notogoneus maarvelis Grande, 2022
†Notogoneus montanensis Grande and Grande, 1999
†Notogoneus osculus Cope, 1885
†Notogoneus parvus Hills, 1934
†Notogoneus squamosseus Blainville, 1818
}}Notogoneus is an extinct genus of prehistoric ray-finned fish. A trace fossil  attributed to Notogoneus osculus'' has been found in the Green River Formation.

See also

Prehistoric fish
 List of prehistoric bony fish

References 

Prehistoric ray-finned fish genera
Gonorynchidae
Prehistoric fish of North America